Coleophora nitidipennella is a moth of the family Coleophoridae. It is found in Afghanistan.

The larvae feed on an Artemisia species, probably Artemisia maritima. They feed on the leaves of their host plant.

References

nitidipennella
Moths described in 1967
Moths of Asia